The necropolis of Pranu Muttedu is one of the most important funerary areas of pre-Nuragic Sardinia and is located near Goni, a small village in the province of South Sardinia. The complex has the highest known concentration of menhirs and megaliths in Sardinia (about sixty, variously distributed in pairs, groups or arrays), two megalithic tombs and a Domus de Janas surrounded by stone circles.

The complex has been excavated by Enrico Atzeni, on several occasions since 1980. The site was used from the Ozieri culture period to the early Copper Age.

Bibliography 
 G. Lilliu, La civiltà dei Sardi dal paleolitico all'età dei nuraghi, Torino, Nuova ERI, 1988;
 E. Atzeni-D. Cocco, Nota sulla necropoli megalitica di Pranu Muttedu-Goni, in La Cultura di Ozieri. Problematiche e nuove acquisizioni, Ozieri, Il Torchietto, 1989, pp. 201–216.
 Goni, Menhir e sepolture megalitiche di Pranu Muttedu

Archaeological sites in Sardinia
Burial monuments and structures